The Men's 1 km time trial competition at the 2022 UCI Track Cycling World Championships was held on 14 October 2022.

Results

Qualifying
The qualifying was started at 14:30. The top eight riders qualified for the final.

Final
The final was started at 20:00.

References

Men's 1 km time trial